Houston Community College (HCC), also known as Houston Community College System (HCCS) is a public community college system that operates community colleges in Houston, Missouri City, Greater Katy, and Stafford in Texas. It is notable for actively recruiting internationally and for the large number of international students enrolled, over 5,700 in 2015. Its open enrollment policies, which do not require proficiency in English, are backed by a full-time 18-month English proficiency program and remedial courses.

As defined by the Texas Legislature, the official service area of HCCS includes the following school districts:
the Houston Independent School District,
the Stafford Municipal School District,
the Spring Branch Independent School District (included in service area by state law, but is not part of the tax base),
the Alief Independent School District,
the Katy Independent School District,
the North Forest Independent School District (now consolidated into Houston ISD),
the portions of the Fort Bend Independent School District located within the cities of Houston, Missouri City, and Pearland.

History
In 1927, the Houston Independent School District founded its first community colleges, Houston Junior College (for whites), which later evolved into the University of Houston and the Houston College for African American students (now Texas Southern University). In 1971, the district founded HCCS after HJC's and HCN's evolutions into the University of Houston and Texas Southern University respectively. In its early days, HCCS once used HISD school campuses for teaching facilities with classes during evenings and weekends like its founders. Around 1997, HCCS began to transfer operations to community college district-operated campuses throughout the HCCS service area.

Former campus in Qatar 
The country of Qatar operates Education City to bring U.S. universities to the Middle East. Houston Community College ran a satellite campus in Education City. However, in early 2016 HCC announced that they were "massively scaling back operations" and closed this campus. Over a five-year period, Qatar's government paid HCC approximately $30.5 million to subsidize the Education City campus. In a news interview, the HCC Board of Trustees Treasurer said he did not support continuing the campus. “We’re a community college to educate kids in our district,” he said. When HCC first sent teachers to its Qatar campus, the Qatari government made some of them return to the United States because they were Jewish.

Police
HCC operates its own police department.

As peace officers, state law grants HCC Police the power to arrest without warrant for any felony, breach of the peace, disorderly conduct or intoxication offense that is committed in their presence or view while in Texas. They may make an arrest pursuant to a warrant anywhere in Texas. The HCC Police Department is divided into six divisions: Administrative, Criminal Investigations, Patrol, Bike Patrol, Training, Communications.

HCC Television

HCCTV began in 1994 when the City of Houston chose the Houston Community College System (HCCS) to operate one of its educational access channels. Already in place since 1980, HCCTV was the college system's video component, producing programs of education, training and college promotion.

HCCS operates Houston Community College Television (HCCTV) on Xfinity Channel 19, TV Max Channel 97, Phonoscope Channel 77 and Cebridge Channel 20 and streamed over the internet. The studio complex, which has one large studio unit, five editing suites, and a digital master control system, is located at the HCC District Campus.

Athletics
HCC offers several sports activities to its students throughout its campuses; the sports offered include:
Soccer (Men & Women)
Basketball (Men & Women)
Volleyball (Women)
Flag Football (Men)
Golf (Men & Women)
Tennis (Men & Women)
Fitness (Men & Women)

List of colleges in HCCS

Central College 

Central Campus (Houston)
HCC Central Campus, in Midtown Houston, is served by a METRORail station, Ensemble/HCC Station. Houston Academy for International Studies of Houston ISD opened on HCC's Central Campus in Fall 2006.
South Campus (Houston)
HCC South Campus is in the Central Southwest area of Houston, and is served by the HCC South Campus bus station.

Coleman College of Health Sciences
Coleman College of Health Sciences (Houston) (located in the Texas Medical Center district)

Northeast College 

Codwell Hall Campus (Houston)
Northline Campus (Houston)
The HCC Northline Campus is the site of HISD's North Houston Early College High School.
Pinemont Campus (Houston)

Northwest College 

Alief Campus (Houston)
The Alief Campus is the site of Alief ISD's Alief Early College High School.
Alief Continuing Education Center (unincorporated Harris County)
Katy Campus
Spring Branch Campus

Southeast College 

Southeast College is home to two separate campuses in different parts of the HCC Southeast service area.

Eastside Campus (Houston)
It is in Pecan Park.

Felix Fraga Academic Campus (Houston)

The Felix Fraga Academic Campus is located a mile and a quarter east of Downtown Houston at 301 N. Drennan St.

The campus opened in January, 2010 and was named for Felix Fraga by the HCC Board of Trustees in honor of his dedication to the educational, social, and economic success of the young people of Houston’s southeast community and his devotion to improving their neighborhood. Fraga served as an HISD trustee and as a member of the Houston City Council. Today he is the Vice President of External Affairs for the Neighborhood Centers, Inc.

The Felix Fraga Campus hosts classes to over 1,500 students every semester. Its flagship offerings include Maritime Logistics, Pre-Engineering, and other STEM (Science, Technology, Engineering, Math) classes. Most core courses are also available.

In partnership with HISD, the Felix Fraga Campus is also the host location of HISD's East Early College High School.

Southwest College

Notable alumni
 Kim Su Tran La, founder of the restaurant chain Kim Sơn.
Chloe Dao, fashion designer and television personality
Scott Duncan, multi-billionaire
Marcus Orelias, entertainer and entrepreneur.

See also

Houston Community College System Foundation

References

External links
	 
 Official website

Two-year colleges in Texas
Buildings and structures in Fort Bend County, Texas
Buildings and structures in Harris County, Texas
Community colleges in Texas
Education in Fort Bend County, Texas
Education in Harris County, Texas
Education in Waller County, Texas
Universities and colleges accredited by the Southern Association of Colleges and Schools
Universities and colleges in Houston
Educational institutions established in 1971
1971 establishments in Texas